At the Show is a live album recorded by MxPx live at the 930 Club, Washington, DC on August 24, 1998 and the TLA, Philadelphia, Pennsylvania on August 25, 1998, released in 1999. At the time of the recording, the band was touring in support of their latest album, 1998's Slowly Going the Way of the Buffalo as well as the B-sides collection Let it Happen, also released in 1998.

Track listing

Personnel
Band

 Mike Herrera - bass, vocals
 Tom Wisniewski - guitars
 Yuri Ruley - drums

References

At the Show
At the Show
At the Show
Albums produced by Bill Stevenson (musician)